Athletes is a 1977 series of silkscreen portraits by American artist Andy Warhol. Commissioned by Richard Weisman, the series consists of ten multi-colored portraits of the most celebrated athletes of the time: Muhammad Ali, Kareem Abdul-Jabbar, Chris Evert, Rod Gilbert, O.J. Simpson, Pelé, Tom Seaver, Willie Shoemaker, Dorothy Hamill, and Jack Nicklaus.

History 
In 1977, art collector Richard Weisman proposed and idea to his friend Andy Warhol. As an avid sports fan, Weisman suggested that Warhol create a series of screen prints portraying the leading sports stars of the day. Warhol, the leading artist of the pop art movement, was an enthusiast of pop culture and Weisman recognized the growing commercialization of sports. Weisman viewed this project as a way of blending sports and art. In 2007, Wesiman told The Art Newspaper: "I spoke to Andy about the idea; I knew he was a groupie and loved to meet famous people." According to Weisman's 2003 book Picasso to Pop: The Richard Weisman Collection, Warhol said, "The sports stars of today are the movie stars of yesterday."

Ten 40 x 40 inch portraits were commissioned by Weisman for $800,000, and Warhol produced eight sets. One portrait was given to each subject, and one portrait of each subject went to Warhol. Of the other sets, three were given to Weisman's children, two were given to the University of Maryland Art Gallery and to University of California, Los Angeles, and one was split among the associations pertaining to each sport.

Weisman chose the subjects for the series: boxer Muhammad Ali, ice skater Dorothy Hamill, association football player Pelé, basketball player Kareem Abdul-Jabbar, baseball player Tom Seaver, ice hockey player Rod Gilbert, tennis player Chris Evert, golfer Jack Nicklaus, jockey Willie Shoemaker, and American football player O.J. Simpson. Three others were considered, then dropped: Evel Knievel, because there was some dispute whether he was an athlete; Julius Erving, because of a contractual issue, and Nadia Comaneci, because of the difficulty contacting the Romanian Athletics Federation. Between March and November 1977, Warhol traveled across the United States, to take Polaroid photographs of each sports star. At his studio, the Factory, he transferred his chosen frames to canvas and applied the color using his silkscreening technique. 

The exhibition opened at the Coe Kerr Gallery on East 82nd Street in New York City on December 9, 1977. The portraits on display were for sale at $25,000 each. 

Warhol made nine individual paintings as "extras," which led to a dispute after his death between his estate, the Andy Warhol Foundation, and Weisman. Weisman had a contract stating that he was the owner of all of the Athletes paintings. "In the end we settled, they gave me all of the Athletes paintings they had and I donated half of them back to the foundation on the understanding that they were not to be sold on the open market without my permission," he said. However, some other Athletes paintings have been sold at auction.

In 2007, Weisman offered his set of Athletes in London through art dealer Martin Summers for a reported $28 million, but it did not sell. The set sold for $5.7 million at Christie's evening contemporary art sale in New York in May 2011. A portrait of the Muhammad Ali portrait from the series, consigned to auction by Weisman's ex-wife, sold at Christie's New York for $9.2 million in 2007. 

In November 2019, a set was offered as individual lots at Christie's in New York, sold for a combined $15,014,000. A portrait of Ali from that lot sold for $10 million. Another set sold at Christie's in London in 2020.

Exhibitions 
Athletes has been exhibited at the following art institutions:

 New York, Coe Kerr Gallery, Athletes by Andy Warhol, December 1977–January 1978.
 Richmond, Virginia Museum of Fine Arts, Athletes by Andy Warhol, January–February 1978.
 Dallas, University Gallery Southern Methodist University, Andy Warhol: Athletes, February–March 1978.
 Houston, Texas Gallery, Andy Warhol's Athletes, April 1978.
 London, Institute of Contemporary Arts, Athletes by Andy Warhol, June–July 1978.

In 2008, the series was shown at the Faurschou gallery in Beijing to coincide with the 2008 Summer Olympics.

Reference 

Paintings by Andy Warhol
Black people in art
1977 paintings
Painting series